A billboard (also called a hoarding in the UK and many other parts of the world) is a large outdoor advertising structure (a billing board), typically found in high-traffic areas such as alongside busy roads. Billboards present large advertisements to passing pedestrians and drivers. Typically brands use billboards to build their brands or to push for their new products.

The largest ordinary-sized billboards are located primarily on major highways, expressways or principal arterials, and command high-density consumer exposure (mostly to vehicular traffic). These afford greatest visibility due not only to their size, but because they allow creative "customizing" through extensions and embellishments.

Posters are the other common form of billboard advertising, located mostly along primary and secondary arterial roads. Posters are a smaller format and are viewed principally by residents and commuter traffic, with some pedestrian exposure.

Advertising style
Billboard advertisements are designed to catch a person's attention and create a memorable impression very quickly, leaving the reader thinking about the advertisement after they have driven past it. They have to be readable in a very short time because they are usually read while being passed at high speeds. Thus there are usually only a few words, in large print, and a humorous or arresting image in brilliant color.

Some billboard designs spill outside the actual space given to them by the billboard, with parts of figures hanging off the billboard edges or jutting out of the billboard in three dimensions. An example in the United States around the turn of the 21st century was the Chick-fil-A billboards (a chicken sandwich fast food chain), which had three-dimensional cow figures in the act of painting the billboards with misspelled anti-beef slogans such as "frendz don't let frendz eat beef."

The first "scented billboard", an outdoor sign emitting the odors of black pepper and charcoal to suggest a grilled steak, was erected on NC 150 near Mooresville, North Carolina by the Bloom grocery chain. The sign depicted a giant cube of beef being pierced by a large fork that extended to the ground. The scents were emitted between 7–10 am and 4–7 pm from 28 May 2010 through 18 June 2010.

Painted billboards

Almost all these billboards were painted in large studios. The image was projected on the series of paper panels that made up the billboard. Line drawings were done, then traced with a pounce wheel that created perforated lines. The patterns were then "pounced" onto the board with a chalk filled pounce bag, marking the outlines of the figures or objects. Using oil paints, artists would use large brushes to paint the image. Once the panels were installed using hydraulic cranes, artists would go up on the installed billboard and touch up the edges between panels. These large, painted billboards were especially popular in Los Angeles where historic firms such as Foster & Kleiser and Pacific Outdoor Advertising dominated the industry. Eventually, these painted billboards gave way to graphic reproduction, but hand-painted billboards are still in use in some areas where only a single board or two is required. The "Sunset Strip" in Los Angeles is one area where hand-painted billboards can still be found, usually to advertise upcoming films or albums.

Artists' Billboards

Art exhibitions on a billboard or billboards are often referred to as artists' billboards or billboarding. These exhibitions are usually conducted by non-establishment Art curators, and feature non-establishment or emerging artists. Artists' Billboards have been a key medium or vehicle to explore and express the ideas and strategies behind the most important art movements over the last fifty years: conceptualism,  dematerialization, temporality,  appropriation, authorship issues, socio-political critique, institutional critique, direct political engagement, such as defending the voices of minorities like women, gays, blacks, different ethnicities, etc., and postmodern concerns about the difference between reality and representation, among many others.

Sometimes, the phrase  "Look Up!" is used in press releases, by art news  journalists, in the title of events, or informally, to describe these exhibitions that are literally in the sky.

Digital billboards

A digital billboard shows varying imagery and text created with computer programs and software. Digital billboards can be designed to display running text, have several different displays from the same company, or provide several companies a certain time slot during the day. Flexible and real-time scheduling can decrease traditional upkeep and maintenance costs, and some billboards may measure audiences or serve dynamic content. Using digital billboards dynamically has come to be known as programmatic out-of-home advertising. Billboard posters can play audio using conductive ink; when touched, the posters begin to play sounds.

Mobile billboards

Outdoor advertising, such as a mobile billboard, is effective because it is difficult to ignore. According to a UK national survey, it is also memorable. Capitol Communications Group found that 81.7% of those polled recalled images they saw on a moving multi-image sign. This is compared to a 19% retention rate for static signs.

Unlike a typical billboard, mobile billboards are able to go directly to their target audience. They can be placed wherever there is heavy foot traffic due to an event – including convention centers, train stations, airports and sports arenas. They can repeat routes, ensuring that an advertiser's message is not only noticed, but that information is retained through repetition.

Multi-purpose billboards

Billboards may be multi-purpose. An advertising sign can integrate its main purpose with telecommunications antenna or public lighting support. Usually the structure has a steel pole with a coupling flange on the above-fitted advertising billboard structure that can contain telecommunications antennas. The lighting, wiring, and any antennas are placed inside the structure.

Other types of billboards

Common along highways are free-standing two-sided as well as three-sided billboards. Other types of billboards include the billboard bicycle attached to the back of a bicycle or the mobile billboard, a special advertising trailer to hoist big banners. Mechanical billboards display three different messages, with three advertisements attached to a conveyor inside the billboard. There are also three-dimensional billboards, such as the ones at Piccadilly Circus, London. Traditional billboards consist of a large format advertisement printed on a resistant material such as vinyl; this is placed on a large metal structure, which makes it one of the media with the most visibility and high impact within the advertising field.

Placement of billboards

Some of the most prominent billboards are alongside highways; since passing drivers typically have little to occupy their attention, the impact of the billboard is greater. Billboards are often drivers' primary method of finding lodging, food, and fuel on unfamiliar highways. There were approximately 450,000 billboards on US highways in 1991. Somewhere between 5,000 and 15,000 are erected each year. Current numbers are put at 368,263, according to the OAAA (outdoor Advertising Association of America). In Europe billboards are a major component and source of income in urban street furniture concepts.

An interesting use of billboards unique to highways was the Burma-Shave advertisements between 1925 and 1963, which had 4- or 5-part messages on multiple signs, keeping the reader hooked by the promise of a punchline at the end. This example is in the National Museum of American History at the Smithsonian Institution:

Shaving brushes
You'll soon see 'em
On a shelf
In some museum
Burma-ShaveThese sort of multi-sign advertisements are no longer common, though they are not extinct. One example, advertising for the NCAA, depicts a basketball player aiming a shot on one billboard; on the next one, 90 yards (82 meters) away, is the basket. Another example is the numerous billboards advertising the roadside attraction South of the Border near Dillon, SC, along I-95 in many states.

Many cities have high densities of billboards, especially where there is dense pedestrian traffic—Times Square in New York City is a good example. Because of the lack of space in cities, these billboards are placed on the sides of buildings and sometimes are free-standing billboards hanging above buildings. Billboards on the sides of buildings create different stylistic opportunities, with artwork that incorporates features of the building into the design, such as using windows as eyes, or for gigantic frescoes that adorn the entire building.

Visual and environmental concerns
Many groups such as Scenic America have complained that billboards on highways cause excessive clearing of trees and intrude on the surrounding landscape, with billboards' bright colors, lights and large fonts making it difficult to focus on anything else, making them a form of visual pollution - a state of affairs evoked pithily in Ogden Nash's parody of Joyce Kilmer's oft-quoted poem Trees:
I think that I shall never seeA billboard lovely as a tree
Indeed, unless the billboards fallI'll never see a tree at all. 
Other groups believe that billboards and advertising contribute negatively to the mental climate of a culture by promoting products as providing feelings of completeness, wellness and popularity to motivate purchase. B.U.G.A. U.P. was a movement which commenced in Australia and took direct action against primarily tobacco and alcohol billboards. Another focal point for this sentiment would be the magazine AdBusters, which will often showcase politically motivated billboard and other advertising vandalism, called culture jamming. Billboards have been criticized as an example of attention theft.

In 2000, rooftops in Athens had grown so thick with billboards that it was difficult to see its famous architecture. In preparation for the 2004 Summer Olympics, the city embarked on a successful four-year project demolishing the majority of rooftop billboards to beautify the city, overcoming resistance from advertisers and building owners. Most of these billboards were illegal, but had been ignored until then.

In 2007, São Paulo, Brazil instituted a billboard ban because there were no viable regulations of the billboard industry. Today, São Paulo is working with outdoor companies to rebuild the outdoor infrastructure in a way that will reflect the vibrant business climate of the city while adopting good regulations to control growth.

Individuals and groups have vandalized billboards worldwide.

Road safety concerns

The most comprehensive review of the literature to date by the Centre for Accident Research and Road Safety-Queensland (CARRS-Q) found that crash risk increases by approximately 25-29% in the presence of digital roadside advertising signs compared to control areas. There is an emerging trend in the literature suggesting that roadside advertising signs can increase crash risk, particularly for those signs that have the capacity to frequently change (often referred to as digital billboards).

In the US, many cities enacted laws banning billboards as early as 1909 (California Supreme Court, Varney & Green vs. Williams) but the First Amendment has made this difficult. A San Diego law championed by Pete Wilson in 1971 cited traffic safety and driver distraction as the reason for the billboard ban, but was narrowly overturned by the Supreme Court in 1981, in part because it banned non-commercial as well as commercial billboards.

Billboards have long been accused of distracting drivers and causing accidents. This may not necessarily be true, as a study by researchers at the University of North Carolina showed. Released in June 2001, the researchers prepared a thorough report on driver distraction for the AAA Foundation for Traffic Safety. This study said:  "The search appears to suggest that some items—such as CB radios, billboards, and temperature controls—are not significant distractions."

Traffic safety experts have studied the relationship between outdoor advertising and traffic accidents since the 1950s, finding no authoritative or scientific evidence that billboards are linked to traffic accidents. However, many of these studies were funded by the Outdoor Advertising Association of America, which has led to accusations of bias. The methodology used in certain studies is also questionable.

The US Department of Transportation, State Department of Transportation and property/casualty insurance companies statistics on fatal accidents indicate no correlation between billboards and traffic accidents. A broad sampling of law enforcement agencies across the country found no evidence to suggest that motor vehicle accidents were caused by billboards. Property and casualty insurance companies have conducted detailed studies of traffic accident records and conclude no correlation between billboards and traffic accidents.

However, studies based on correlations between traffic accidents and billboards face the problem of under-reporting: drivers are unwilling to admit responsibility for a crash, so will not admit to being distracted at a crucial moment. Even given this limitation, some studies have found higher crash rates in the vicinity of advertising using variable message signs or electronic billboards.

It is possible that advertising signs in rural areas reduce driver boredom, which many believe is a contribution to highway safety. On the other hand, drivers may fixate on a billboard which unexpectedly appears in a monotonous landscape, and drive straight into it (a phenomenon known as "highway hypnosis").

Surveys of road users show that the lighting provided by billboards provide security and visibility to many motorists. The Federal Highway Administration (FHWA) went on record (Federal Register, 5 March 1999) stating that the agency agrees that appropriately regulated billboards do not compromise highway safety. This statement was made before the release of the FHWA report Research review of potential safety effects of electronic billboards on driver attention and distraction'' in 2001. What level of regulation is appropriate for billboards in different areas is still under discussion by road safety experts around the world.

Laws limiting billboards
Billboards are largely absent in Australia's capital city, Canberra, due to a 1937 ordinance which prohibited unauthorized signs on Commonwealth land. In 2017, the Australian Capital Territory considered relaxing this law to allow more outdoor advertising. An Inquiry into billboards received a record 166 submissions, with only 6 respondents supporting allowing more advertising in the Territory. The other submissions supported the current laws, or pointed to shortcomings and loopholes of the current laws, such as the allowance of mobile billboards, bus wrap advertising and political campaign signs, as well a failure to enforce existing laws.

In 1964, the negative impact of the over-proliferation of signage was abundantly evident in Houston, Texas, USA, and it motivated Lady Bird Johnson to ask her husband to create a law. At the same time the outdoor advertising industry was becoming aware that excessive signs, some literally blocking another, was bad for business.

In 1965, the Highway Beautification Act was signed into law. The act applied only to "Federal Aid Primary" and "Defense" highways and limited billboards to commercial and industrial zones created by states and municipalities. It required each state to set standards based on "customary use" for the size, lighting and spacing of billboards, and prohibited city and state governments from removing billboards without paying compensation to the owner. The act requires states to maintain "effective control" of billboards or lose 10% of their federal highway dollars.

The act also required the screening of junk yards adjacent to regulated highways.

Around major holidays, volunteer groups erected highway signs offering free coffee at rest stops. These were specifically exempted in the act.

Currently, four states—Vermont, Alaska, Hawaii, and Maine—have prohibited billboards. Vermont's law went into effect in 1968, Hawaii's law went into effect in 1927, Maine's law went into effect in 1977, and Alaska's law went into effect upon its achievement of statehood in 1959.

In the UK, billboards are controlled as adverts as part of the planning system. To display an illegal advert (that is, without planning permission) is a criminal offence with a fine of up to £2500 per offence (per poster). All of the large UK outdoor advertisers such as CBS Outdoor, JCDecaux, Clear Channel, Titan and Primesight have numerous convictions for such crimes.

In São Paulo, a city of twelve million in Brazil, Billboards and advertising on vehicles have been banned since January 2007. It also restricted the dimensions of advertising on shop fronts.

In British Columbia, a province of Canada, billboards are restricted to 300m away from roadways, the government also retains the right to remove any billboard it deems an unsafe distraction.

In Toronto, a city of over 2 and a half million in Canada, a municipal tax on billboards was implemented in April 2010. A portion of the tax will help fund arts programs in the city.

In Sweden there is a general ban against billboards within the road area (typically the road plus ditch), except for standardized signs such as gas station, restaurant or hotel. But there is no ban against them outside the road, if the landowner approves. Many farmers along major routes earn some money from such signs.

Usages

Highway

Many signs advertise local restaurants and shops in the coming miles, and are crucial to drawing business in small towns. One example is Wall Drug, which in 1936 erected billboards advertising "free ice water". The town of Wall, South Dakota, was essentially built around the many thousands of customers per day those billboards brought in (20,000 in 1981). Some signs were placed at great distances, with slogans such as "only 827 miles to Wall Drug, with FREE ice water."  In some areas the signs were so dense that one almost immediately followed the last. This situation changed after the Highway Beautification Act was passed; the proliferation of Wall Drug billboards is sometimes cited as one of the reasons the bill was passed. After the passage of the act, other states (such as Oregon) embarked on highway beautification efforts.

Railway
Billboard advertising in underground stations, especially, is perhaps a place where they find a greater degree of acceptability and may assist in maintaining a neat, vibrant and safe atmosphere if not too distracting. Museum Station, Sydney has mounted restored 1940s billboard panels along the platforms that are in keeping with its heritage listing.

Big name advertisers
Billboards are also used to advertise national or global brands, particularly in more densely populated urban areas. According to the Outdoor Advertising Association of America, the top billboard advertisers in the United States in 2017 were McDonald's, Apple and GEICO. A large number of wireless phone companies, movie companies, car manufacturers and banks are high on the list as well.

Tobacco advertising

Prior to 1999, billboards were a major venue of cigarette advertising; 10% of Michigan billboards advertise alcohol and tobacco, according to the Detroit Free Press. This is particularly true in countries where tobacco advertisements are not allowed in other media. For example, in the US, tobacco advertising was banned on radio and television in 1971, leaving billboards and magazines as some of the last places tobacco could be advertised. Billboards made the news in America when, in the tobacco settlement of 1999, all cigarette billboards were replaced with anti-smoking messages.  In a parody of the Marlboro Man, some billboards depicted cowboys riding on ranches with slogans like "Bob, I miss my lung."

Likely the best-known of the tobacco advertising boards were those for "Mail Pouch" chewing tobacco in the United States during the first half of the 20th century (pictured at left). The company agreed to paint two or three sides of a farmer's barn any color he chose in exchange for painting their advertisement on one or two sides of the structure facing the road. The company has long since abandoned this form of advertising, and none of these advertisements have been painted in many years, but some remain visible on rural highways.

Non-commercial use

Not all billboards are used for advertising products and services—non-profit groups and government agencies use them to communicate with the public. In 1999 an anonymous person created the God Speaks billboard campaign in Florida "to get people thinking about God", with witty statements signed by God. "Don't make me come down there", "We need to talk" and "Tell the children that I love them" were parts of the campaign, which was picked up by the Outdoor Advertising Association of America and continues today on billboards across the country.

South of Olympia, Washington is the privately owned Uncle Sam billboard. It features conservative, sometimes inflammatory messages, changed on a regular basis. Chehalis farmer Al Hamilton first started the board during the Johnson era, when the government was trying to make him remove his billboards along Interstate 5. He had erected the signs after he lost a legal battle to prevent the building of the freeway across his land. Numerous legal and illegal attempts to remove the Uncle Sam billboard have failed, and it is now in its third location. One message, attacking a nearby liberal arts college, was photographed, made into a postcard and is sold in the College Bookstore.

Governance
The Traffic Audit Bureau for Media Measurement Inc. (TAB) was established in 1933 as a non-profit organization whose historical mission has been to audit the circulation of out-of-home media in the United States. TAB's role has expanded to lead and support other major out of home industry research initiatives. Governed by a tripartite board composed of advertisers, agencies and media companies, the TAB acts as an independent auditor for traffic circulation in accordance with guidelines established by its board of directors.

Similarly, in Canada, the Canadian Outdoor Measurement Bureau (COMB) was formed in 1965 as a non-profit organization independently operated by representatives composed of advertisers, advertising agencies and members of the Canadian out-of-home advertising industry. COMB is charged with the verification of traffic circulation for the benefit of the industry and its users.

History

Early billboards were basically large posters on the sides of buildings, with limited but still appreciable commercial value. As roads and highways multiplied, the billboard business thrived.
 Late 15th century – Flyposting was widely practiced throughout Europe.
 1796 – Lithography was invented, making real posters possible.
 1835 – Jared Bell was making 9 × 6 posters for the circus in the U.S.
 1867 – Earliest known billboard rentals
 1871 – Fredrick Walker designed one of the first art posters.
 1872 – International Bill Posters Association of North America was established (now known as the Outdoor Advertising Association of America) as a billboard lobbying group.
 1889 – The world's first 24-sheet billboard was displayed at the Paris Exposition and later at the 1893 World's Columbian Exposition in Chicago. The format was quickly adopted for various types of advertising, especially for circuses, traveling shows, and movies.
 Early 1900s – Poster art schools were established in England, Austria and Germany.
 1908 – The Model T automobile was introduced in the U.S., increasing the number of people using highways and therefore the reach of roadside billboards.
 1919 – Japanese candy company Glico introduced its building-spanning billboard, the Glico Man.
 1925 – Burma-Shave made billboards lining the highways.
 1936 – The Wall Drug billboards started to go up nationwide.
 1960 – The mechanized Kani Doraku billboard was built in Dotonbori, Osaka.

 1965 – The Highway Beautification Act was passed after much campaigning by Lady Bird Johnson.
 1971 – The Public Health Cigarette Smoking Act banned cigarette ads in television and radio, moving that business into billboards.
 1981 – The Supreme Court overturned a San Diego billboard ban, but left room open for other cities to ban commercial billboards.
 1986 – Non-television advertising became restricted – as now, non-television adverts could not show people smoking. This meant that Benson & Hedges and Silk Cut, amongst other brands, advertised their cigarettes through increasingly indirect and obscure campaigns to a point where they became recognizable.
 1998 – The four major U.S. tobacco companies signed the Tobacco Master Settlement Agreement, which eliminated billboard advertising of cigarettes in 46 states.
 2007 – The industry adopted one-sheet plastic poster replacement for paper poster billboards and began the phase-out of PVC flexible vinyl, replacing it with eco-plastics such as polyethylene.
 2010 – The first "scented billboard", emitting odors similar to charcoal and black pepper to suggest a steak grilling, was erected in Mooresville, North Carolina by the Bloom grocery chain to promote the sale of beef.
 2010 – Augmented billboards were introduced in the Transmediale Festival 2010 in Berlin using Artvertiser.

Notable billboards
 Hollywood Sign
 The Citgo Sign, Kenmore Square, Boston
 Coca-Cola billboard in Kings Cross, Sydney, Australia
 Coca-Cola sign
 Monarch advertising sign
 Osborne bull figures in Spain
 Paddy Power Cleeve Hill Sign
 Piccadilly Circus illuminated signs
 Valdivieso advertising sign
 Pepsi Super Bowl sponsorship

See also

 Advertising board
 Advertising column
 Billboard bicycle
 Billboard hacking
 Digital billboard
 Ghost sign
 Human billboard
 Marquee (sign)
 Mediascape
 Neon sign
 Out-of-home advertising
 Poster
 Publicity
 Rotulo
 Sales promotion
 Street furniture
 Truckside advertisement
 Visual pollution

References

Advertising structures
Advertising by medium
Billboards
Street furniture
Promotion and marketing communications